Porscha Lucas (born June 18, 1988) is an American sprinter from Plano, Texas who specializes in the 100 metres and 200 metres. She was a two time NCAA 200m outdoor champion and All-American for Texas A&M University helping them with back-to-back wins in the NCAA Track & Field Championships 2009–2010 seasons.

Personal bests

References

External links
 

1988 births
Living people
Sportspeople from Plano, Texas
American female sprinters
21st-century American women